Kiran Sethi is a police officer in Delhi, India, known for organizing women's self-defense and police services training camps throughout India, for which she was honored by Union Home Minister Rajnath Singh in 2015.

Biography 
Kiran Sethi's family comes from Delhi. She studied journalism at the Indian Institute of Mass Communication before joining the police in 1987. She holds the rank of Sub-Inspector of police (SI), and often investigates cases of sexual assault and child sexual abuse. She is a chief trainer in the self-defence course 'Prahar', which by 2015, had trained more than 5000 school and university students. She has also trained more than 200 hearing and sight impaired students in self-defence. Organising the largest demonstration of self-defence by school students resulted in her name being entered into the Limca Book of Records. In 2014, while off-duty, Sethi saved a blind girl from being kidnapped and assaulted by a drunken man.

Martial arts achievements 

 Black belt, 1999, from the World Karate Organization
 Winner of National Competition by Taekwondo Federation of India in 2000
 Represented India in 15th World Cup in 2006

References 

Indian women police officers
Living people
Year of birth missing (living people)